Helix nucula is a species of air-breathing land snail, a terrestrial pulmonate gastropod mollusk in the family Helicidae, the typical snails. According to the malacologist E. Neubert, the taxonomy of this species is rather complex; the species has been confused with Helix figulina, a related species. Scientists who conducted a study using mitochondrial DNA sequences confirmed that H. nucula is a distinct monophyletic species, and within that clade are two lineages that were well distinguished, one from the North African population and the other from southwest Crete (Psonis 2015).

Distribution 
This land snail mainly inhabits areas near the south and west coasts of Turkey as well as the Aegean Islands of Greece. Although its range is mostly limited to areas of Turkey and Greece, in the local language of Crete these snails are sometimes called "barbarésos" or "bárbaros", which might suggest that they came from Barbaria (North Africa).

References

External links

Helix (gastropod)
Gastropods described in 1854